Laticranium mandibulare is a species of beetle in the family Cerambycidae, and the only species in the genus Laticranium. It was described by Lane in 1959.

References

Lamiinae
Beetles described in 1959